This is a list of New Zealand television-related events in 1977.

Events
The Governor, a six-part historical TV miniseries on Sir George Grey, screened in September and October.
A television series about sheepdog trials A Dog's Show starts its broadcasting on TV One.

Debuts
 Fair Go - consumer affairs show, still running in 2008. TVNZ
 A Week of It - political satire. South Pacific Television

Television shows
No information on television shows this year.

Ending this year
Ngaio Marsh Theatre (TV One) (1977)

Births
13 November — Chanel Cole, New Zealand-Australian singer
15 December — Dominic Bowden, TV host

 
1970s in New Zealand television